Branimir Živojinović (Belgrade, 10 June 1930 – Belgrade, 20 August 2007) was a Serbian poet and translator.

Biography 
His parents were Velimir Živojinović Masuka, a theatre director, and Danica (née Radmilović), a French teacher. Živojinović studied philosophy at the University of Belgrade, graduated in 1957, and later also taught there. He translated various literary works from German to Serbian, including Goethe's Faust and poems by Rainer Maria Rilke.

Bibliography 
 Dopiranje, Nolit, Belgrade 1972
 Označavanja, Matica Srpska, Novi Sad 1972

References 

Serbian male poets
1930 births
2007 deaths
20th-century Serbian poets
Writers from Belgrade
Translators of Johann Wolfgang von Goethe